Matthew Broughton (8 October 1880–1957) was an English footballer who played in the Football League for Nottingham Forest and Notts County.

References

1880 births
1957 deaths
English footballers
Association football forwards
English Football League players
Nottingham Forest F.C. players
Grantham Town F.C. players
Notts County F.C. players
Watford F.C. players